Fierabras (French Fièrebrace) is a medieval nickname derived from the Latin fera brachia (wild arms) or ferox brachium (ferocious arm). It is first recorded by Pierre de Maillezais, writing c. 1060, as a nickname of William IV, Duke of Aquitaine (ruled 963–90). It can also refer to:

Fierabras, a fictional Saracen knight in several chansons de geste
William of Gellone, duke of Toulouse (r. 790–811)

See also 

Fierrabras (opera), an opera based on the legendary Fierabras
The nickname "Iron Arm" (French Bras-de-fer) is related:
Baldwin Iron Arm (d. 879), margrave of Flanders
William Iron Arm (d. 1046), count of Apulia

Notes 

Lists of people by nickname